Skidmore Studio is a multi-disciplinary design studio headquartered in Detroit, Michigan. Founded by Leo Skidmore in 1959, the company began as an illustration studio for the automotive industry. Today, Skidmore Studio provides branding and design services to a range of consumer packaged goods companies and cultural institutions. The studio employs approximately 16 employees, including graphic designers, illustrators, copywriters, producers, and strategists.

History 

Skidmore Studio was established in 1959 as an automotive illustration studio. The studio built a reputation in the 1950s and 60s for illustration work completed for Ford, General Motors and Chrysler. Until the mid 1970s, the studio worked exclusively on automotive advertising with local and national advertising agencies such as Campbell Ewald, Leo Burnett Worldwide, McCann Worldwide, Team Detroit and Doner. At the time, Skidmore employed many notable illustrators in addition to Leo Skidmore including Ed Fella, Ron Alexander, John Ball, Ann Bauer, Stephen Magsig, Scott Olds and Bryan Stolzenburg.

In the early 1990s, Leo Skidmore’s daughter Mae Skidmore assumed ownership of the studio. With then Vice President Tim Smith, Skidmore expanded the studio’s offering and client base to include corporate clients such as the Detroit Institute of Arts, Detroit Symphony Orchestra and Detroit Medical Center. In 2010, then-president Tim Smith, acquired majority interest of the studio and became CEO.

In 2011, the studio relocated from Royal Oak, Michigan to downtown Detroit, furthering the city's resurgence of the creative class. Skidmore Studio now resides as the anchor tenant of the historic Madison Theatre Building, an entrepreneurial hub for creative and tech companies. The studio occupies the entire fourth floor of the Madison, taking up 9,800 square feet. It was purchased in November 2010 by Dan Gilbert, Chairman and Founder of Quicken Loans as part of his Detroit real estate initiatives. Skidmore Studio was the first official tenant of Gilbert’s real estate development firm, Bedrock. 
In January 2018, then-owner Tim Smith passed away suddenly. The studio was left to his wife and partner, Colleen Smith. In October 2018, Drew Patrick, previously the company’s CFO and president, purchased the studio from Smith.

Project history 

During the 1950s and 1960s, the studio was respected as one of the country's most talented automotive illustration studios. Notable advertising campaigns from that period included work for: 
 Ford
 Pontiac
 Detroit Diesel
 Buick
 Lincoln
 Dodge
 Mercury

In the 1970s and 1980s, Skidmore continued developing national advertising campaigns for a wider clientele that included: 
 McDonald's
 Portland Cement Association
 Reynold's Aluminum
 Key Video

In the 1990s and 2000s, Skidmore transitioned to a direct-to-client model with a renewed focus on the local market for clients like:
 Ski-Doo
 Detroit Institute of Arts
 Detroit Symphony Orchestra
In the 2010s, Skidmore further specialized in branding and identity, with a focus on the food and entertainment industries both locally and nationally. Current and past clients include:
 Dave & Buster’s
 American Express
 Regal Cinemas
 Family Finest
 Michigan Farm to Freezer
 Inspired Organics
 Halo Burger
 Universal Orlando Resort
 Xenith
 Skis.com
 The Detroit Tigers

Free Art Friday Detroit 

In 2011, the studio launched Free Art Friday Detroit, a free art scavenger hunt in the city of Detroit. With a mission to elevate the profile of the city's creative community and encourage people to explore the city, Free Art Friday Detroit (FAFDET) has become a weekly art event throughout the city.

References

External links
 

Design companies of the United States
Companies based in Detroit
Design companies established in 1959
1959 establishments in Michigan